Mark D. Zoback is an American geophysicist and Emeritus Faculty at Stanford University. He is also a senior fellow at the Precourt Institute for Energy at Stanford University, an Elected Fellow of the American Association for the Advancement of Science and the National Academy of Engineering, and he directs or co-directs the Stanford Center for Induced and Triggered Seismicity (SCITS), the Stanford Natural Gas Initiative (NGI), and the Stanford Rock Physics and Borehole Geophysics program (SRB). Zoback is the author of the textbook Reservoir Geomechanics. Zoback is the author of over 300 peer-reviewed publications and he holds seven patents. He is married to the American geophysicist Mary Lou Zoback.

Selected publications

References

Year of birth missing (living people)
Living people
Fellows of the American Association for the Advancement of Science
American geophysicists
Stanford University alumni
University of Arizona alumni